An annular solar eclipse occurred on August 20, 1952. A solar eclipse occurs when the Moon passes between Earth and the Sun, thereby totally or partly obscuring the image of the Sun for a viewer on Earth. An annular solar eclipse occurs when the Moon's apparent diameter is smaller than the Sun's, blocking most of the Sun's light and causing the Sun to look like an annulus (ring). An annular eclipse appears as a partial eclipse over a region of the Earth thousands of kilometres wide. Annularity was visible from Peru including the capital city Lima, northeastern Chile, Bolivia including the constitutional capital Sucre and seat of government La Paz, Argentina, Paraguay, southern Brazil and Uruguay.

Related eclipses

Solar eclipses of 1950–1953

Saros 144 

It is a part of Saros cycle 144, repeating every 18 years, 11 days, containing 70 events. The series started with partial solar eclipse on April 11, 1736. It contains annular eclipses from July 7, 1880, through August 27, 2565. There are no total eclipses in the series. The series ends at member 70 as a partial eclipse on May 5, 2980. The longest duration of annularity will be 9 minutes, 52 seconds on December 29, 2168.
<noinclude>

Notes

References

1952 8 20
1952 in science
1952 8 20
August 1952 events